

The Kharkov KhAI-24 was a 1960s Soviet two-seat autogyro designed by the Kharkiv Aviation Institute.

Design and development
The KhAI-24 was designed by students of the Kharkiv Aviation Institute for an Estonian Ministry for the Energy Industry competition for a light autogyro for power cable inspection. The two-seat autogyro had an enclosed cabin and a tricycle landing gear, it was powered by a  Walter M332 aircraft engine driving a tractor configuration two-bladed propeller. A three-bladed rotor was fitted above the cabin.  A full-scale model was displayed in 1966 in Moscow and the autogyro was tested in 1967 but nothing else is known.

Specifications

See also

Notes

References
 

1960s Soviet civil utility aircraft
Kharkiv Aviation Institute aircraft
Single-engined tractor autogyros